Francis Child (c.1735-63), of Osterley Park, Middlesex, was an English politician.

He was a Member (MP) of the Parliament of England for Bishop's Castle 1761 - 23 September 1763.

References

1735 births
1763 deaths
People from Isleworth
Members of the Parliament of Great Britain for English constituencies
British MPs 1761–1768
Francis 3